Yeomchang is a railway station on Line 9 of the Seoul Subway.

Station layout

References

Seoul Metropolitan Subway stations
Metro stations in Gangseo District, Seoul
Railway stations opened in 2009